The Man of Sorrows is a 1532 painting by the Dutch Golden Age painter Maarten van Heemskerck in the collection of the Museum of Fine Arts, Ghent. It shows the Man of Sorrows.

The subject depicts Christ after the crucifixion attended by angels, with wounds prominently displayed, wearing the crown of thorns and a loincloth.  The loincloth is claimed to be wrapped around an erection, visible to some art historians but not others.  Van Heemskerck is not the only Renaissance artist allegedly to depict Christ with an erection (ostentatio genitalium), which some scholars interpret as a symbol of his resurrection and continuing power.

Other versions of Christ crowned with thorns by Heemskerck are:

References

1532 paintings
Paintings of Christus Dolens
Angels in art
Paintings by Maarten van Heemskerck
Paintings in the collection of the Museum of Fine Arts, Ghent